The 1908 Lafayette football team was an American football team that represented Lafayette College as an independent during the 1908 college football season. In its first and only season under head coach George Barclay, the team compiled a 6–2–2 record, shut out six opponents, and outscored all opponents by a total of 102 to 57. George McCaa was the team captain. The team played its home games at March Field in Easton, Pennsylvania.

Schedule

References

Lafayette
Lafayette Leopards football seasons
Lafayette football